Nilay Naik belongs to the Bharatiya Janata Party. On 10 July 2018, he was elected unopposed with 10 others to the Maharashtra Legislative Council.

References

Living people
Nationalist Congress Party politicians from Maharashtra
Year of birth missing (living people)